Seyed Mahmoud-Reza Sajjadi is an Iranian diplomat and the former Ambassador of Iran to Russia, presenting his credentials to Russian President Dmitry Medvedev on 16 January 2009.

References

Living people
Ambassadors of Iran to Russia
1960 births
People from Tehran